"Def. Con. One" is a single by Pop Will Eat Itself released in July 1988 from the album This Is the Day...This Is the Hour...This Is This!. The single reached #63 in the UK Singles chart.

The song combines several musical genres and features elements of alternative rock, hip-hop, pop and punk, but was proclaimed by the band to be grebo rock. It is an early example of a song composed by sampling other songs and musical scores, including "I Wanna Be Your Dog" by the Stooges, "Funkytown" by disco band Lipps Inc., the 1973 hit "Crazy Horses" by the Osmonds and The Twilight Zone theme tune. The title comes from the United States' Defense Readiness Condition DEFCON 1, which signifies that "war is imminent."

Several versions of the song are found on the single, although none is the version that would appear on This Is the Day...This Is the Hour...This Is This! the following year. The live tracks that appear on the 12" and CD editions were recorded in Gothenburg, Sweden during a tour in March 1988.

A music video was recorded for the song that appears on the 1991 video release Unspoilt by Progress. It features the band performing the song in front of a large image of the This Is the Day...This Is the Hour...This Is This! album cover. An effect is used that freezes and blurs the image several times a second. The album version of the song is used in the video.

Track listing

7" version
Side One
 "Def.Con.One (7" Version)" 3:44
Side Two
 "Inside You (Live in Gothenburg)" 2:33

12" version
Side One
 "Def.Con.One (12" Version)" 4:40
Side Two
 "Inside You (Live in Gothenburg)" 2:38
 "She's Surreal (Live in Gothenburg)" 4:20
 "Hit the Hi-Tech Groove (Live in Gothenburg)" 5:01

CD version
 "Def.Con.One (7" Version)" 3:44
 "Inside You (Live in Gothenburg)" 2:38
 "She's Surreal (Live in Gothenburg)" 4:20
 "Hit the Hi-Tech Groove (Live in Gothenburg)" 5:01

Remix 12" version
Side One
 "Def.Con.One (The Doomsday Powermix)" 5:58
Side Two
 "Def.Con.One (7" Version)" 3:44
 "Inside You (Live in Gothenburg)" 2:38
 "She's Surreal (Live in Gothenburg)" 4:20.

References

External links
 http://www.popwilleatitself.co.uk/def-con-one/#.VbiONvmqqko
 http://pweination.com/pwei/

1988 singles
1988 songs
Pop Will Eat Itself songs
Songs written by Graham Crabb
Songs written by Clint Mansell